Murdo Davidson MacLeod (born 24 September 1958 in Glasgow) is a Scottish former professional football player and manager. MacLeod, who played as a midfielder, made 20 appearances for Scotland and played in the 1990 World Cup Finals. He had a successful club career, mainly with Dumbarton, Celtic, Borussia Dortmund and Hibernian. He then became a manager during the mid-1990s, serving both Dumbarton and Partick Thistle. MacLeod then returned to Celtic as assistant manager, enjoying a successful season in tandem with Wim Jansen. Since leaving Celtic as a result of Jansen's departure from Celtic Park in 1998, MacLeod has worked as a football pundit for newspapers, radio and television.

Playing career
MacLeod made his name with Dumbarton in the mid-1970s. He earned selection by the Scottish League in 1978, playing in a 1–1 draw against the Italian League. MacLeod moved to Celtic later that year for a £100,000 transfer fee. During his nine years at Celtic Park, MacLeod won five league titles, two Scottish Cups and one League Cup. MacLeod has the distinction of being awarded with scoring the greatest ever Old Firm goal, in a vote by Celtic supporters in 2000; the goal helped Celtic win the league championship in 1979, in a decisive match against Rangers.

MacLeod rejected a contract offer from Celtic in May 1987 and moved to German club Borussia Dortmund a month later. MacLeod played in 103 Bundesliga games during four years at the Westfalenstadion. He won the German Cup and Super Cup in 1989. He returned to Scotland with Hibernian, where he captained the club to a victory in the 1991 Scottish League Cup Final.

MacLeod had to wait until late in his career before becoming a Scotland regular. He made his debut appearance as a substitute against England in the 1985 Rous Cup. He made his first starting appearance for Scotland in October 1986, aged 28. MacLeod went on to win a total of 20 caps, playing in the 1990 FIFA World Cup tournament.

Coaching career

After a successful playing career, he returned to Dumbarton as player-coach. He guided the club to promotion from the Second Division with a last day win over Stirling Albion in 1995. In the summer of 1995, MacLeod left the Sons to manage Premier Division club Partick Thistle. MacLeod's tenure at Firhill was unsuccessful, as the club were relegated at the end of the 1995–96 season. He re-joined Celtic as assistant coach under Wim Jansen, where he helped the club win a league and Scottish League Cup double in 1997–98, their only season in charge.

Media work
MacLeod has written for the Daily Record and commentated on football for BBC Scotland and BBC Radio Scotland. MacLeod has also worked as a Scottish football analyst on Newstalk radio in Ireland. In 2012, he starred on the CBeebies show "My Story" with his grandsons, Murdo Jr. and Ross.

Personal life
MacLeod was admitted to Golden Jubilee Hospital in Clydebank during January 2010 to have a heart operation.

MacLeod endorsed the Conservative Party in the 2010 General Election, campaigning for their candidate in the Argyll & Bute constituency. During the 2014 Scottish independence referendum he was a supporter of the Better Together campaign against Scottish independence.

Honours

Player
Celtic
Scottish Premier Division (5)
Scottish Cup (2)
Scottish League Cup (1)

Borrusia Dortmund
DFB-Pokal (German Cup) (1): 1988–89

Hibernian
Scottish League Cup (1): 1991–92

Manager
Dumbarton
Stirlingshire Cup : 1993–94
Scottish Second Division promotion : 1994–95

See also
 List of footballers in Scotland by number of league appearances (500+)

References

External links 

1958 births
Living people
Footballers from Glasgow
Association football midfielders
Scottish footballers
Scotland international footballers
1990 FIFA World Cup players
Dumbarton F.C. players
Celtic F.C. players
Borussia Dortmund players
Hibernian F.C. players
Scottish expatriate footballers
Expatriate footballers in West Germany
Scottish expatriate sportspeople in West Germany
Scottish Football League players
Bundesliga players
Scottish football managers
Hibernian F.C. non-playing staff
Dumbarton F.C. managers
Partick Thistle F.C. managers
Celtic F.C. non-playing staff
Scottish association football commentators
Scottish Football League representative players
Scotland under-21 international footballers
Scottish Football League managers
Conservative Party (UK) people
Partick Thistle F.C. players
Association football player-managers